Mordellinae is a subfamily of beetles commonly known as tumbling flower beetles for the typical irregular movements they make when escaping predators, or as pintail beetles due to their abdominal tip which aids them in performing these tumbling movements.

Tribe and genera
 Tribe Conaliini Ermisch, 1956
 Conalia Mulsant & Rey, 1858
 Conaliamorpha Ermisch, 1968
 Glipodes LeConte, 1862
 Isotrilophus Liljeblad, 1945
 Ophthalmoconalia Ermisch, 1968
 Paraconalia Ermisch, 1968
 Pseudoconalia Ermisch, 1950
 Stenoconalia Ermisch, 1967
 Xanthoconalia Franciscolo, 1942
 Tribe Mordellini Siedlitz, 1875
 Adelptes Franciscolo, 1965
 Asiamordella Hong, 2002
 Austromordella Ermisch, 1950
 Binaghia Franciscolo, 1943
 Boatia Franciscolo, 1985
 Caffromorda Franciscolo, 1952
 Calycina Blair, 1922
 Cephaloglipa Franciscolo, 1952
 Congomorda Ermisch, 1955
 Cothurus Champion, 1891
 Cretanaspis Huang & Yang, 1999
 Curtimorda Méquignon, 1946
 Glipa LeConte, 1859
 Glipidiomorpha Franciscolo, 1952
 Hoshihananomia Kônô, 1935
 Iberomorda Méquignon, 1946
 Ideorhipistena Franciscolo, 2000
 Klapperichimorda Ermisch, 1968
 Larinomorda Ermisch, 1968
 Liaoximordella Wang, 1993
 Machairophora Franciscolo, 1943
 Macrotomoxia Píc, 1922
 Mirimordella Liu, Lu & Ren, 2007
 Mordella Linnaeus, 1758
 Mordellina Schilsky, 1908
 Mordellapygium Ray, 1930
 Mordellaria Ermisch, 1950
 Mordelloides Ray, 1939
 Mordellopalpus Franciscolo, 1955
 Neocurtimorda Franciscolo, 1950
 Neotomoxia Ermisch, 1950
 Ophthalmoglipa Franciscolo, 1952
 Paramordella Píc, 1936
 Paramordellana Ermisch, 1968
 Paramordellaria Ermisch, 1968
 Paraphungia Ermisch, 1969
 Parastenomordella Ermisch, 1950
 Paratomoxia Ermisch, 1950
 Paratomoxioda Ermisch, 1954
 Phungia Píc, 1922
 Plesitomoxia Ermisch, 1955
 Praemordella Shchegoleva-Barovskaya, 1929
 Pseudomordellaria Ermisch, 1950
 Pseudotomoxia Ermisch, 1950
 Sphaeromorda Franciscolo, 1950
 Stenaliamorda Ermisch & Chûjô, 1968
 Stenomorda Ermisch, 1950
 Stenomordella Ermisch, 1941
 Stenomordellaria Ermisch, 1950
 Stenomordellariodes Ermisch, 1954
 Succimorda Kubisz, 2001
 Tolidomordella Ermisch, 1950
 Tolidomoxia Ermisch, 1950
 Tomoxia Costa, 1854
 Tomoxioda Ermisch, 1950
 Trichotomoxia Franciscolo, 1950
 Variimorda Méquignon, 1946
 Wittmerimorda Franciscolo, 1952
 Yakuhananomia Kônô, 1935
 Zeamordella Broun, 1886
 Tribe Mordellistenini Ermisch, 1941
 Asiatolida Shiyake, 2000
 Calyce Champion, 1891
 Calycemorda Ermisch, 1969
 Calyceoidea Ermisch, 1969
 Dellamora Normand, 1916
 Diversimorda Ermisch, 1969
 Ermischiella Franciscolo, 1950
 Fahraeusiella Ermisch, 1953
 Falsomordellina Nomura, 1966
 Falsomordellistena Ermisch, 1941
 Falsopseudomoxia Franciscolo, 1965
 Glipostena Ermisch, 1941
 Glipostenoda Ermisch, 1950
 Gymnostena Franciscolo, 1950
 Mordellina Schilsky, 1908
 Mordellistena Costa, 1854
 Mordellistenalia Ermisch, 1958
 Mordellistenochroa Horák, 1982
 Mordellistenoda Ermisch, 1941
 Mordellistenula Stchegoleva-Barowskaja, 1930
 Mordellochroa Emery, 1876
 Mordellochroidea Ermisch, 1969
 Mordelloxena Franciscolo, 1950
 Morphomordellochroa Ermisch, 1969
 Neomordellistena Ermisch, 1950
 Palmorda Ermisch, 1969
 Paramordellistena Ermisch, 1950
 Phunginus Píc, 1922
 Pselaphokentron Franciscolo, 1955
 Pseudodellamora Ermisch, 1942
 Pseudotolida Ermisch, 1950
 Raymordella Franciscolo, 1956
 Tolida Mulsant, 1856
 Tolidopalpus Ermisch, 1951
 Tolidostena Ermisch, 1942
 Uhligia Horák, 1990
 Xanthomorda Ermisch, 1968
 Tribe Reynoldsiellini Franciscolo, 1957
 Reynoldsiella Ray, 1930
 Tribe Stenaliini Franciscolo, 1956
 Brodskyella Horák, 1989
 Pselaphostena Franciscolo, 1950
 Stenalia Mulsant, 1856
 Stenaliodes Franciscolo, 1956

References

 
Polyphaga subfamilies